The 2013 British Indoor Athletics Championships was the 7th edition of the national championship in indoor track and field for the United Kingdom. It was held from 9–10 February 2013 at the English Institute of Sport, Sheffield, England. A total of 24 events (divided evenly between the sexes) were contested over the two-day competition. It served as the selection meet for Great Britain at the 2013 European Athletics Indoor Championships.

Results

Men

Women

References

British Athletics European Trials, National Indoor Championships, English Institute of Sport Sheffield  GBR  9 - 10 February 2013 Indoor. Tilastopaja. Retrieved 2019-07-14.

British Indoor Athletics Championships
Athletics competitions in England
Sports competitions in Sheffield
British Indoor Championships
Athletics Indoor
British Indoor Athletics Championships